The following is a list of beetle species of the superfamily Tenebrionoidea recorded in Great Britain. For other beetles, see List of beetle species recorded in Britain.

Family Mycetophagidae

Pseudotriphyllus suturalis (Fabricius, 1801)
Triphyllus bicolor (Fabricius, 1777)
Litargus balteatus LeConte, 1856
Litargus connexus (Geoffroy in Fourcroy, 1785)
Mycetophagus atomarius (Fabricius, 1787)
Mycetophagus fulvicollis Fabricius, 1793
Mycetophagus multipunctatus Fabricius, 1793
Mycetophagus piceus (Fabricius, 1777)
Mycetophagus populi Fabricius, 1798
Mycetophagus quadriguttatus P. W. J. Müller, 1821
Mycetophagus quadripustulatus (Linnaeus, 1761)
Typhaea stercorea (Linnaeus, 1758)
Eulagius filicornis (Reitter, 1887)

Family Ciidae

Octotemnus glabriculus (Gyllenhal, 1827)
Ropalodontus perforatus (Gyllenhal, 1813)
Sulcacis affinis (Gyllenhal, 1827)
Strigocis bicornis (Mellié, 1849)
Orthocis alni (Gyllenhal, 1813)
Orthocis coluber (Abeille, 1874)
Cis bidentatus (Olivier, 1790)
Cis bilamellatus Wood, 1884
Cis boleti (Scopoli, 1763)
Cis dentatus Mellié, 1849
Cis fagi Waltl, 1839
Cis festivus (Panzer, 1793)
Cis hispidus (Paykull, 1798)
Cis jacquemartii Mellié, 1849
Cis lineatocribratus Mellié, 1849
Cis micans (Fabricius, 1792)
Cis nitidus (Fabricius, 1792)
Cis punctulatus Gyllenhal, 1827
Cis pygmaeus (Marsham, 1802)
Cis vestitus Mellié, 1849
Cis villosulus (Marsham, 1802)
Ennearthron cornutum (Gyllenhal, 1827)

Family Tetratomidae

Hallomenus binotatus (Quensel, 1790)
Tetratoma ancora Fabricius, 1791
Tetratoma desmarestii Latreille, 1807
Tetratoma fungorum Fabricius, 1790

Family Melandryidae

Orchesia micans (Panzer, 1793)
Orchesia minor Walker, 1836
Orchesia undulata Kraatz, 1853
Anisoxya fuscula (Illiger, 1798)
Abdera affinis (Paykull, 1799)
Abdera biflexuosa (Curtis, 1829)
Abdera flexuosa (Paykull, 1799)
Abdera quadrifasciata (Curtis, 1829) ?
Abdera triguttata (Gyllenhal, 1810)
Phloiotrya vaudoueri Mulsant, 1856
Xylita laevigata (Hellenius, 1786)
Hypulus quercinus (Quensel, 1790)
Zilora ferruginea (Paykull, 1798)
Melandrya barbata (Fabricius, 1787)
Melandrya caraboides (Linnaeus, 1761)
Conopalpus testaceus (Olivier, 1790)
Osphya bipunctata (Fabricius, 1775)

Family Mordellidae

Tomoxia bucephala A. Costa, 1853
Mordella holomelaena Apfelbeck, 1914
Mordella leucaspis Küster, 1849
Variimorda villosa (Schrank, 1781)
Mordellistena brevicauda (Boheman, 1849)
Mordellistena humeralis (Linnaeus, 1758)
Mordellistena neuwaldeggiana (Panzer, 1796)
Mordellistena parvula (Gyllenhal, 1827)
Mordellistena pseudoparvula Ermisch, 1956
Mordellistena pseudopumila Ermisch, 1962
Mordellistena pumila (Gyllenhal, 1810)
Mordellistena pygmaeola Ermisch, 1956
Mordellistena secreta Horák, 1983
Mordellistena variegata (Fabricius, 1798)
Mordellistena acuticollis Schilsky, 1895
Mordellistena nanuloides Ermisch, 1967
Mordellochroa abdominalis (Fabricius, 1775)

Family Ripiphoridae
Metoecus paradoxus (Linnaeus, 1761)

Family Zopheridae

Pycnomerus fuliginosus Erichson, 1842
Orthocerus clavicornis (Linnaeus, 1758)
Synchita humeralis (Fabricius, 1792)
Synchita separanda (Reitter, 1882)
Cicones undatus Guérin-Méneville, 1829
Cicones variegatus (Hellwig, 1792) (may belong in Synchita)
Bitoma crenata (Fabricius, 1775)
Endophloeus markovichianus (Piller & Mitterpacher, 1783)
Langelandia anophthalma Aubé, 1843
Colydium elongatum (Fabricius, 1787)
Aulonium ruficorne (Olivier, 1790)
Aulonium trisulcus (Geoffroy in Fourcroy, 1785)

Family Tenebrionidae

Lagria atripes Mulsant & Guillebeau, 1855
Lagria hirta (Linnaeus, 1758)
Bolitophagus reticulatus (Linnaeus, 1767)
Eledona agricola (Herbst, 1783)
Tenebrio molitor Linnaeus, 1758
Tenebrio obscurus Fabricius, 1792
Alphitobius diaperinus (Panzer, 1796)
Alphitobius laevigatus (Fabricius, 1781)
Tribolium castaneum (Herbst, 1797)
Tribolium confusum Jacquelin du Val, 1863
Tribolium destructor Uyttenboogaart, 1934
Latheticus oryzae C. O. Waterhouse, 1880
Palorus ratzeburgii (Wissmann, 1848)
Palorus subdepressus (Wollaston, 1864)
Uloma culinaris (Linnaeus, 1758)
Phylan gibbus (Fabricius, 1775)
Melanimon tibialis (Fabricius, 1781)
Opatrum sabulosum (Linnaeus, 1758)
Helops caeruleus (Linnaeus, 1758)
Nalassus laevioctostriatus (Goeze, 1777)
Xanthomus pallidus (Curtis, 1830)
Blaps lethifera Marsham, 1802
Blaps mortisaga (Linnaeus, 1758)
Blaps mucronata Latreille, 1804
Crypticus quisquilius (Linnaeus, 1761)
Phaleria cadaverina (Fabricius, 1792)
Myrmechixenus subterraneus Chevrolat, 1835
Myrmechixenus vaporariorum Guérin-Méneville, 1843
Corticeus bicolor (Olivier, 1790)
Corticeus fraxini (Kugelann, 1794)
Corticeus linearis (Fabricius, 1790)
Corticeus unicolor Piller & Mitterpacher, 1783
Scaphidema metallicum (Fabricius, 1793)
Alphitophagus bifasciatus (Say, 1823)
Gnatocerus cornutus (Fabricius, 1798)
Gnatocerus maxillosus (Fabricius, 1801)
Pentaphyllus testaceus (Hellwig, 1792)
Platydema violaceum (Fabricius, 1790)
Diaperis boleti (Linnaeus, 1758)
Prionychus ater (Fabricius, 1775)
Prionychus melanarius (Germar, 1813)
Gonodera luperus (Herbst, 1783)
Pseudocistela ceramboides (Linnaeus, 1758)
Isomira murina (Linnaeus, 1758)
Mycetochara humeralis (Fabricius, 1787)
Cteniopus sulphureus (Linnaeus, 1758)
Omophlus betulae (Herbst, 1783)

Family Oedemeridae

Nacerdes melanura (Linnaeus, 1758)
Chrysanthia geniculata (formerly Chrysanthia nigricornis)
Ischnomera caerulea (Linnaeus, 1758)
Ischnomera cinerascens (Pandellé, 1867)
Ischnomera cyanea (Fabricius, 1793)
Ischnomera sanguinicollis (Fabricius, 1787)
Oedemera femoralis (formerly Oncomera femorata)
Oedemera lurida (Marsham, 1802)
Oedemera nobilis (Scopoli, 1763)
Oedemera virescens (Linnaeus, 1767)

Family Meloidae

Lytta vesicatoria (Linnaeus, 1758)
Meloe autumnalis Olivier, 1792
Meloe brevicollis Panzer, 1793
Meloe cicatricosus Leach, 1813
Meloe mediterraneus J. Müller, 1925
Meloe proscarabaeus Linnaeus, 1758
Meloe rugosus Marsham, 1802
Meloe variegatus Donovan, 1793
Meloe violaceus Marsham, 1802
Sitaris muralis (Forster, 1771)

Family Mycteridae
Mycterus curculioides (Fabricius, 1781)

Family Pythidae
Pytho depressus (Linnaeus, 1767)

Family Pyrochroidae

Pyrochroa coccinea (Linnaeus, 1761)
Pyrochroa serraticornis (Scopoli, 1763)
Schizotus pectinicornis (Linnaeus, 1758)

Family Salpingidae

Aglenus brunneus (Gyllenhal, 1813)
Lissodema cursor (Gyllenhal, 1813)
Lissodema denticolle (Gyllenhal, 1813)
Rabocerus foveolatus (Ljungh, 1824)
Rabocerus gabrieli Gerhardt, 1901
Sphaeriestes ater (Paykull, 1798)
Sphaeriestes castaneus (Panzer, 1796)
Sphaeriestes reyi (Abeille, 1874)
Vincenzellus ruficollis (Panzer, 1794)
Salpingus planirostris (Fabricius, 1787)
Salpingus ruficollis (Linnaeus, 1761)

Family Anthicidae

Notoxus monoceros (Linnaeus, 1761)
Anthicus angustatus Curtis, 1838
Anthicus antherinus (Linnaeus, 1761)
Anthicus bimaculatus (Illiger, 1801)
Anthicus flavipes (Panzer, 1797)
Anthicus tristis Schmidt, 1842
Cyclodinus constrictus (Curtis, 1838)
Cyclodinus salinus (Crotch, 1867)
Omonadus bifasciatus (Rossi, 1792)
Omonadus floralis (Linnaeus, 1758)
Omonadus formicarius (Goeze, 1777)
Cordicomus instabilis (Schmidt, 1842)
Stricticomus tobias (Marseul, 1879)

Family Aderidae

Aderus populneus (Creutzer in Panzer, 1796)
Euglenes oculatus (Paykull, 1798)
Vanonus brevicornis (Perris, 1869)

Family Scraptiidae

Scraptia dubia (Olivier, 1790)
Scraptia fuscula P. W. J. Müller, 1821
Scraptia testacea Allen, 1940
Anaspis bohemica Schilsky, 1898
Anaspis fasciata (Forster, 1771)
Anaspis frontalis (Linnaeus, 1758)
Anaspis garneysi Fowler, 1889
Anaspis lurida Stephens, 1832
Anaspis maculata (Geoffroy in Fourcroy, 1785)
Anaspis pulicaria A. Costa, 1854
Anaspis regimbarti Schilsky, 1895
Anaspis thoracica (Linnaeus, 1758)
Anaspis costai Emery, 1876
Anaspis rufilabris (Gyllenhal, 1827)

References 

Tenebrionoid beetles